Dimethylcadmium is the organocadmium compound with the formula Cd(CH3)2.  It is a colorless, highly toxic liquid that fumes in air. It is a linear molecule with C-Cd bond lengths of 213 pm. The compound finds limited use as a reagent in organic synthesis and in metalorganic chemical vapor deposition (MOCVD). It has also been used in the synthesis of cadmium selenide nanoparticles, although efforts have been made to replace it in this capacity due to its toxicity.

Dimethylcadmium is prepared by treating cadmium dihalides with methyl Grignard reagents or methyllithium.
CdBr2 + 2 CH3MgBr → Cd(CH3)2 + 2 MgBr2
The same method was used in the first preparation of this compound. 

Dimethylcadmium is a weak Lewis acid, forming a labile adduct with diethyl ether. A yellow, air-senstive adduct is formed with 2,2'-bipyridine.

References 

Cadmium compounds
Neurotoxins
Foul-smelling chemicals
Methyl complexes
Substances discovered in the 1910s